Brooke House in Ashbocking, north of Ipswich in Suffolk is the headquarters of the Suffolk Wildlife Trust.

The house was left to the trust by Mary Brooke. About 25 members of staff and several volunteers work at the house. It has gardens with fruit trees and a pond, where water voles have been observed.

References

Suffolk Wildlife Trust